The following is a list of Royal Air Force air chief marshals.  The rank of air chief marshal is a four-star officer rank and currently the highest rank to which RAF officers may be promoted to in a professional capacity. Throughout the history of the RAF there have been 140 RAF officers promoted to air chief marshal and at present only one RAF officer holds the rank in an active capacity. He is Sir Michael Wigston, the Chief of the Air Staff (the only dedicated RAF 4-star post).

The rank was first used in 1922 when Sir Hugh Trenchard the then Chief of the Air Staff was promoted.  Up until the mid-1930s there was usually only one RAF officer in the rank of air chief marshal.  During World War II, with the great expansion of the RAF, the number of air chief marshals active at any one time peaked at nine during the War.  This number of air chief marshals was to remain approximately constant throughout the Cold War but after the British defence cuts of the mid-1990s there were only two dedicated 4-star RAF posts, namely the AOC-in-C, Strike Command and the Chief of the Air Staff.  In 2007 with the reduction to a single command (Air Command) the RAF initially retained two air chief marshal posts (the AOC-in-C, Air Command and the Chief of the Air Staff) but in 2012 the post of AOC-in-C, Air Command was subsumed within the responsibilities of the Chief of the Air Staff leaving only a single dedicated RAF air chief marshal post.

List of air chief marshals

Number of air chief marshals by year
The following chart indicates the number of serving air chief marshals by year, as counted on 1 January each year.

Honorary air chief marshals
The Prince of Wales, promoted 1 January 1935, assumed the rank of Marshal of the Royal Air Force on 21 January 1936
The Duke of Gloucester, promoted 27 October 1944
The Shah of Iran, promoted 5 May 1959
King Olav V of Norway, promoted 15 September 1959
Frederick IX of Denmark, promoted 15 September 1959
Gustaf VI Adolf of Sweden, promoted 15 September 1959
King Hussein I bin Talal I of Jordan, promoted 19 July 1966
Princess Alice, Duchess of Gloucester, promoted 23 February 1990
The Sultan of Brunei, promoted 5 November 1992
The Duke of Kent, promoted 1 July 1996
The Prince of Wales, promoted 14 November 2006 promoted to Marshal of the Royal Air Force 16 June 2012 
The Princess Royal, promoted 15 August 2020

See also
List of United States Air Force four-star generals
List of Royal Australian Air Force air marshals (includes air chief marshals)
List of British Army full generals
List of Royal Marines full generals
List of Royal Navy admirals

References

External links
Air of Authority - A History of RAF Organisation - Air Chief Marshals

Lists of British military personnel
Lists of air marshals
Four-star officers